The Municipality of Mascot was a local government area in the inner south of Sydney, New South Wales, Australia. The municipality was proclaimed as the Borough of North Botany on 29 March 1888 and was renamed to the Municipality of Mascot, in order to differentiate itself from their southern neighbour, from 31 October 1911. It included the modern suburbs of Eastlakes and Daceyville, with parts of Mascot and Pagewood. From 1 January 1949, the council was amalgamated into the Municipality of Botany, with the passing of the Local Government (Areas) Act 1948.

Council history

Early years and development
The North Botany area was first incorporated on 29 March 1888, when the Governor of New South Wales, Lord Carrington, proclaimed the "Borough of North Botany", the same day the Municipality of Botany was proclaimed immediately to the south. The first council was elected on 4 June 1888, with nine aldermen elected at-large:

The Council first met on 7 June 1888 at "Eurimbla" , the house of the first returning officer John Pottie, and James Coward was elected the first mayor, with William Coleman appointed first Town Clerk in July 1888. In February 1889 council petitioned for the division of the area into Wards: North Ward, South Ward and Central Ward. This was accepted and proclaimed on 10 June 1889. On 31 January 1908, these wards were abolished. From 28 December 1906, following the passing of the Local Government Act, 1906, the council was renamed as the "Municipality of North Botany". Aldermen at this time included Henry Punter (1894–1901), later Mayor of The Glebe.
 
At the July 1888 meeting, council resolved to purchase a block of land at the corner of Botany Road and Ricketty Street (Later Edward Street, then Coward Street, after the first mayor) at the cost of £600. On 21 December 1889, the foundation stone was laid for the new Town Hall, designed in the Victorian Italianate style by C. Hawkins and built by Edward Christie. The Town Hall was officially opened by the Mayor, James Coward, on 2 August 1890. However, within a few years, it had become apparent that this town hall was inadequate for the purposes of a growing council and area, along with the need for a modern function hall compliant with the Theatres and Public Halls Act. Council resolved in 1910, to commission expansions along the Edward Street frontage. This expansion, designed in a similar style by Buchanan & McKay, Architects, and built by Peter Doulan, was named "Coronation Hall" to commemorate the coronation of George V and opened on 8 July 1911.

Following incorporation, the council area developed a strong industrial character similar to its northern neighbours of Alexandria, Waterloo and St Peters. A Sydney Morning Herald profile of the council in 1914 expressed this change: "During the first year of its existence, the council had less than £1000 to work upon. This year the revenue will reach £6000. The district now carries a population of 8500, which is housed in 1750 buildings. [...] Like its neighbour, Botany, Mascot has developed into an industrial centre, and in this respect is making splendid progress. In fact, the whole district will in time become the Birmingham of Australia."

Name change
With these changes in the local area, the "North Botany" name of the council however raised negative connotations and it was felt in council that it was too similar in name to their southern neighbour; As a result, in early 1911, council conducted a referendum of ratepayers to decide on a new name, with "Ascot" being chosen, which referenced the nearby racecourse. However, when council submitted this request to the state Minister for Public Works, Arthur Griffith, and the Commonwealth Postmaster General, Josiah Thomas, it was rejected based on the view that "Ascot" was a term already well-used for place names. Council then debated on several other options, including "Boronia" and "Booralee", before "Mascot" was chosen, accepted and proclaimed on 31 October 1911.

Later history
 The council established a reputation for its probity and prudent financial management, at a time when the small Sydney municipalities were often struggling to keep up with infrastructure demands, population growth and political infighting. The Construction and Local Government Journal praised Mascot council in this vein in a March 1920 editorial, noting "Mascot is essentially a working man's suburb, but the fashionable socialism of Labor Government does not appear to find favor with the sturdy, thrifty working men and intelligent women who have votes in this Municipality, and the reason is not very far to seek, for it is a remarkable circumstance that nearly all the residents own their own homes." At the same time, planning had begun for the construction of a larger public airfield at Mascot, with the Commonwealth Government purchasing 65 hectares for this purpose in 1921. Indeed, the Mayor in 1920, Thomas Hicks, declared: "The year has marked a new era for the Municipality of Mascot in the establishment of an aerodrome by the Australian Aircraft and Engineering Company of Australia, on the area between Cook's River and Old Botany Road. This site has been pronounced as the favored-by-nature of any other in the County of Cumberland, and the establishment of the air-service undertaking must bring Mascot very prominently before the world." Such was the pride the council took in its growing recognition with aviation, that they changed the council seal in the 1930s to depict an aircraft in flight. Aldermen during this time included Thomas Mutch (1923–1930), MLA for Botany (1917–1930).

In 1929, Mascot council inaugurated a new Council Chambers building, designed in the Inter-war Georgian Revival style by R. S. Hamilton and built by J. Figures of Randwick, located on Coward Street next to the 1890 Town Hall and 1911 Coronation Hall. This building remained the council seat until amalgamation in 1948 and was demolished in the 1970s to be replaced by the Botany Administration Centre.

By the end of the Second World War, the NSW Government had realised that its ideas of infrastructure expansion could not be effected by the present system of the patchwork of small municipal councils across Sydney and the Minister for Local Government, Joseph Cahill, following the recommendations of the 1945–46 Clancy Royal Commission on Local Government Boundaries, passed a bill in 1948 that abolished a significant number of those councils. Under the Local Government (Areas) Act 1948, Mascot Municipal Council became the First Ward of the Municipality of Botany, which was located immediately to the south. The serving Mascot Town Clerk, T. G. Barber, became Town Clerk of the re-formed Municipality of Botany.

Mayors

Town Clerks

References

External links

Mascot
Mascot
Mascot
Mascot
Botany Bay
Mascot, New South Wales